Etienne Fynn is a South African professional rugby union football coach and former player. He is currently the head coach of the  side that participates in the Currie Cup. He had previously spent the past decade coaching within the Sharks system.

References

Living people
South African rugby union players
South Africa international rugby union players
Sharks (rugby union) players
Sharks (Currie Cup) players
Rugby union props
South African rugby union coaches
1972 births